Filipinos in Ireland consist largely of migrant workers in the health care sector, though others work in tourism and information technology. From just 500 individuals in 1999, the first group of nurses arrived in April of 2001 at the time six recruitments companies had been involved with the large influx of Filipino coming into Ireland they had grown to a population of 11,500 by 2007, a 2200% expansion in just eight years. June 2009 the first Philippines embassy opened its doors to the Filipino community it was long overdue according to the Filipino council of leaders. In August of 2009 the Filipino community network was sworn in by the new ambassador Ariel Abadilia in the blessed sacrament church the following people where representatives of various communities in Ireland. These nurses form the largest category of non-European Union workers in Ireland. According to Census 2011, there are 12,791 people of Filipino origin living in the state.

Migration history
In 1990, the United Nations estimated that there were 774 Filipinos living in Ireland. Ireland began targeting the Philippines for recruitment of nurses in the late 1990s. From 2000 onwards, the Philippines was targeted as a major reservoir of nursing labour, and Ireland quickly became a major destination for Filipino nurses. By 2002 Ireland was the third largest importer of Filipino nurses, after Saudi Arabia and the UK. By 2006, 3,831 Filipinos worked as nurses in Ireland, making them the largest group of foreign nurses, roughly one-fifth larger than Indians, the next largest group. Because of the high cost of obtaining a work permit, Filipino nurses earned a net of 30% less than market-rate wages (after paying for the permit) during their first year on the job.

Though workers from non-European Union countries could bring their spouses with them into Ireland, the spouses were barred from taking up employment. Filipinos, in conjunction with a variety of NGOs, began efforts to have this policy changed as early as 2002. The government altered the policy in February 2004—largely with the intent of retaining Filipino nurses, whom it was feared would otherwise migrate to other countries, such as the United Kingdom or Australia, which allowed spouses to work. However, that same year, an amendment to  the constitution limited the scope of jus soli, thus excluding the children of migrant workers from automatic citizenship; the League of Filipino Nurses took its first public political position in response to the amendment, calling it "discriminatory and racist" in an 8 June 2004 statement.

In addition to nurses, roughly 2,000 Filipinos worked as caregivers in elderly care homes as of 2006; the Irish government offers training programmes enabling them to become nurses.

The Philippines opened an embassy in Dublin in July 2009, but closed it three years later. Subsequent to the closure, the Philippines appointed Mark Congdon as Honorary Consul.

Demographics by city and county

See also
Ireland–Philippines relations

References

External links
Filipinos in Ireland, a series of articles from Metro Éireann
Philippine Honorary Consul, Ireland

Ethnic groups in Ireland
Ireland